Song Hye-soo (born 27 August 1999) is a South Korean handball player for Incheon Business H.S and the South Korean national team.

She participated at the 2017 World Women's Handball Championship.

International honours
Junior World Championship: 
Bronze Medalist: 2018

Awards and recognition 
 Junior World Championship Most Valuable Player: 2018

References

1999 births
Living people
South Korean female handball players